Alni (also Romanized as Ālnī; also known as ‘Ali, Āllī, and Elī) is a town in Meshgin-e Sharqi Rural District of the Central District of Meshgin Shahr County, Ardabil province, Iran. At the 2006 census, its population was 2,945 in 755 households. The following census in 2011 counted 3,303 people in 991 households. The latest census in 2016 showed a population of 3,739 people in 1,197 households; it was the largest village in its rural district.

References 

Meshgin Shahr County

Towns and villages in Meshgin Shahr County

Populated places in Ardabil Province

Populated places in Meshgin Shahr County